The premier of the State Council of the People's Republic of China,  commonly called the premier of China, is the head of government of China and leader of the State Council. The premier is the second-highest ranking person in China's political system, under the general secretary of the Chinese Communist Party/president of China (paramount leader), and holds the highest rank in the civil service of the central government.

The premier is responsible to the National People's Congress and its Standing Committee. The premier serves for a five-year term, renewable once. The premier presides over the plenary and executive meetings of the State Council, and is assisted by four vice premiers in their work. Every premier has been a member of the Politburo Standing Committee since the PRC's founding in 1949, except during brief transition periods. In China's political system, the premier has generally thought to be the one responsible for managing the economy.

The incumbent premier is Li Qiang, who took office on 11 March 2023, succeeding Li Keqiang.

History 

In 1989, premier Li Peng used the authority of his office to order the military crackdown of the Tiananmen Square protests of 1989.

Since the 1980s, there has been a division of responsibilities between the premier and the CCP general secretary wherein the premier is responsible for the economy and the technical details of implementing government policy while the general secretary gathers the political support necessary for government policy. However, this has been overturned under the leadership of CCP general secretary Xi Jinping, who has centralized power around himself, and taken responsibility over areas that were traditionally the domain of the premier, including the economy.

The premier was historically chosen within the Chinese Communist Party (CCP) through deliberations by incumbent CCP Politburo members and retired CCP Politburo members as part of the process of determining membership in the incoming new CCP Politburo Standing Committee. Under this informal process, the eventual future premier is initially chosen as a vice premier before assuming the position of premier during a subsequent round of leadership transitions. This changed under Xi, with his ally and current premier Li Qiang never having served as vice premier.

Powers and duties 
Officially, the premier is approved by the National People's Congress upon the nomination of the president. In practice, the premier is chosen within the Chinese Communist Party (CCP) leadership, including the Politburo Standing Committee. The premier has been supported by four vice premiers since Deng Xiaoping's reform in 1983. The first-ranked vice premier acts in the premier's capacity in their absence. Both the premier and the vice premiers are selected once every five years and are limited to two terms. The premier has always been a member of the Politburo Standing Committee of the Chinese Communist Party.

The premier is the highest administrative position in the Government of China. The premier heads the State Council and is responsible for organizing and administering the Chinese civil bureaucracy. For example, the premier is tasked with planning and implementing national economic, social development and the state budget. This includes overseeing the various ministries, departments, commissions and statutory agencies and announcing their candidacies to the National People's Congress for vice-premiers, state councillors and ministerial offices. The premier's role and responsibilities are codified into the constitution unlike a prime minister's from the Westminster system as by convention or traditions.

The premier does not have command authority over the armed forces, but is generally the head of the National Defense Mobilization Commission which is a department of the armed forces.

See also 

 List of leaders of the People's Republic of China
 List of premiers of China
 List of Chinese leaders

Further reading

References

External links 
 
 Corpus of Political Speeches Free access to the Prime Minister’s work report and political speeches from other regions, developed by the Hong Kong Baptist University Library.

 
1954 establishments in China